Julian (Luljan) Gjeloshi (born 1 April 1974, in Lezhë) is a retired Albanian footballer/goalkeeper who last played for KF Laçi in Albania.

Club career
Gjeloshi played for Atromitos F.C. in the Beta Ethniki during the 2002–03 season. He joined Proodeftiki F.C. in the Alpha Ethniki for the next season, but he did not appear in any league matches.

International career
He made his debut for Albania in a January 2002 Bahrain Tournament match against hosts Bahrain, coming on as a second half sub for Ilion Lika. It would remain his only cap.

References

External links
 

1974 births
Living people
People from Lezhë
Albanian footballers
Association football goalkeepers
Albania international footballers
Besëlidhja Lezhë players
Flamurtari Vlorë players
FK Partizani Tirana players
KF Vllaznia Shkodër players
Hemel Hempstead Town F.C. players
Partick Thistle F.C. players
Atromitos F.C. players
Proodeftiki F.C. players
FC Torpedo Minsk players
Apollon Smyrnis F.C. players
KF Laçi players
Albanian expatriate footballers
Expatriate footballers in England
Expatriate footballers in Scotland
Expatriate footballers in Greece
Expatriate footballers in Belarus
Expatriate footballers in Cyprus
Albanian expatriate sportspeople in England
Albanian expatriate sportspeople in Scotland
Albanian expatriate sportspeople in Greece
Albanian expatriate sportspeople in Belarus
Albanian expatriate sportspeople in Cyprus